James Patrick Powers (born February 6, 1953) is an American prelate of the Roman Catholic Church, serving as the bishop of the Diocese of Superior in Wisconsin since 2016.

Biography

Early life 
James Powers was born in Baldwin, Wisconsin on February 6, 1953.  His parents Thomas and Frances Roberta (Bobbie) Powers, ran a farm in Hammond, Wisconsin. James Powers had six siblings.  He attended grade school and St. Croix Central High School in Hammond.

After his high school graduation, Powers attended Holy Redeemer College in Waterford, Wisconsin, the College of St. Thomas in St. Paul, Minnesota, and St. John Vianney Seminary in St. Paul.  He received a Bachelor of Theology degree from St. John.

Priesthood 
Powers was ordained a priest of the Diocese of Superior on May 20, 1990 at Immaculate Conception Church in Hammond by Bishop Raphael M. Fliss. After his ordination, Powers received the following pastoral assignments in Wisconsin parishes;

 Associate pastor of St. Joseph in Rice Lake 
 Temporary parochial administrator of St. Bridget in River Falls 
 Parochial administrator of St. John the Baptist in Webster
 Parochial administrator of Sacred Hearts of Jesus and Mary in Crescent Lake
 Parochial administrator of Our Lady of Perpetual Help in Danbury
 Pastor of St. Bridget in River Falls

In 1996, Powers left St. Bridget to enter Saint Paul University in Ottawa, Canada, where he was awarded his Licentiate of Canon Law. Returning to Wisconsin in 1998, he had the following pastoral assignments in parishes:

 Pastor of St. Pius X in Solon Springs 
 Pastor of St. Mary in Minong  
 Pastor of St. Anthony of Padua in Gordon for five years  
 Pastor of St. Joseph in Rice Lake for 11 years.  At the end of this period, three other parishes were clustered with St. Joseph, with Powers as pastor of the cluster.   
Powers' diocesan roles included spiritual director for Teens Encounter Christ (TEC); a member of the St. Pius Priest Fund Board of Directors, membership on the Priest Personnel Placement Board and the Presbyteral Council.  In 1998, Powers was appointed adjutant judicial vicar and in 2010 Vicar General.

Bishop of Superior
Powers was appointed by Pope Francis as bishop of the Diocese of Superior on December 15, 2015.  He was consecrated on February 18, 2016, at the Cathedral of Christ the King in Superior, Wisconsin by Archbishop Jerome E. Listecki.

See also

 Catholic Church hierarchy
 Catholic Church in the United States
 Historical list of the Catholic bishops of the United States
 List of Catholic bishops of the United States
 Lists of patriarchs, archbishops, and bishops

References

External links
Diocese of Superior

1953 births
Living people
People from Baldwin, Wisconsin
Saint Paul Seminary School of Divinity alumni
21st-century Roman Catholic bishops in the United States
Roman Catholic bishops of Superior
Religious leaders from Wisconsin
Bishops appointed by Pope Francis